Dieumerci is a Congolese given name. Notable people with the name include:

 Dieumerci Amale (born 1998), Congolese footballer
 Dieumerci Mbokani (born 1985), Congolese footballer
 Dieumerci Ndongala (born 1991), Congolese footballer

See also
 Dieumerci!, French comedy

African given names